Gech Su-ye Pain (also Romanized as Gech Sū-ye Pā’īn; also known as Gechī Sū-ye Pā’īn and Gechī Sū-ye Soflá) is a village in Tamran Rural District, in the Central District of Kalaleh County, Golestan Province, Iran. At the 2006 census, its population was 228, in 61 families.

References 

Populated places in Kalaleh County